Surinder Khanna  (born 3 June 1956, in Delhi, India) is a former Indian cricketer. He played domestic cricket for Delhi and played ten One Day Internationals for India between 1979 and 1984. He was a Wicket-keeper.

Born 
Surinder Khanna was born at 3 June 1956 in the capital of India, Delhi.

Domestic career
Surinder Khanna played for Delhi in the Ranji Trophy. He made his debut in 1976. A century in each innings (111 and 128) in the Ranji Trophy final against Karnataka at Bangalore in 1978–79 brought Surinder Khanna into the limelight. That season, he scored 657 runs (73.00) to star in Delhi's maiden triumph in the national competition. A capable wicketkeeper and a dashing middle order batsman, Khanna was a tower of strength to Delhi for many years and played a leading role in their successes in the late 70s and early 80s.

International career
When the selectors decided to drop Syed Kirmani for the tour of England in 1979, Khanna was given the big break. He was the designated wicket-keeper for India in the 1979 World Cup. He played without much success in all the three World Cup games and the Test place went to the other debutant Bharath Reddy. He did not enjoy a very good record in the first class games, scoring but 41 runs in six games (four innings). He was dropped from the Indian team after that.

With Syed Kirmani and Bharath Reddy firmly entrenched as the two leading wicketkeepers in the country, Khanna's career seemed over. But he continued to do well for Delhi and his natural style of play suited the ODI game. He was recalled back to the Indian team for the 1984 Asia Cup held at Sharjah. He scored half centuries in low scoring encounters against Sri Lanka and Pakistan. India won the tournament and Khanna was named Man of the Series.
He was a member of the Indian team that went to Pakistan in October the same year. He played in the first ODI in which India lost to Pakistan by 46 runs. He was dropped after this game and never made it back to the Indian team.

He continued to pile on the runs for Delhi and eventually finished his career with over 5000 First Class runs. He achieved his highest score of 220 not out against Himachal Pradesh in 1987–88.

Between 1991 and 1992 he was the professional for Stewarts Melville Royal High CC in Edinburgh. During the 1991 season he scored 1098 runs at an average of 91.5. Nowadays, he is visiting AIR (All India Radio) studios as a cricketing expert during the matches.

International awards

One Day International Cricket

Man of the Match awards

References

Delhi cricketers
Indian cricketers
India One Day International cricketers
North Zone cricketers
1956 births
Living people
Cricketers at the 1979 Cricket World Cup
Wicket-keepers